Abbas Yales-e Do (also Romanized as ‘Abbās Yāles-e Do) is a village in Tarrah Rural District, Hamidiyeh District, Ahvaz County, Khuzestan Province, Iran. At the 2006 census, its population was 306, in 54 families.

References 

Populated places in Ahvaz County